Vers may refer to:

Vers (Lahn), a river of Hesse, Germany
Vers (Lot), a river of southern France, tributary of the Lot
an abbreviation for the trigonometric function "versine"
an abbreviation for versatile (sex), commonly used in Western gay male culture
an acronym for Victorian Electronic Records Strategy, a system for records management
an alias for Carol Danvers in the 2019 superhero film Captain Marvel

Places in France
Vers is the name or part of the name of several communes in France:
 Vers, in the Lot département
 Vers, in the Saône-et-Loire département
 Vers, in the Haute-Savoie département
 Vers-en-Montagne, in the Jura département
 Vers-Pont-du-Gard, in the Gard département
 Vers-sous-Sellières, in the Jura département
 Vers-sur-Méouge, in the Drôme département
 Vers-sur-Selles, in the Somme département